The Memphis Group, also known as Memphis Milano, was an Italian design and architecture group founded by Ettore Sottsass. It was active from 1980 to 1987. The group designed postmodern furniture, lighting, fabrics, carpets, ceramics, glass and metal objects.

The Memphis group's work often incorporated plastic laminate and terrazzo materials and was characterized by ephemeral design featuring colorful and abstract decoration as well as asymmetrical shapes, sometimes arbitrarily alluding to exotic or earlier styles and designs.

Background
Memphis was born on the evening of December 11, 1980, when Sottsass invited a group of young designers and architects to discuss the future of design. Together, they wanted to change the concept of what design had been focused on, which had been Modernism and aimed to do so by creating and forming a new design collective. After their initial meeting, the group went away to brainstorm different ideas and concepts, and three months later, came back together ready to share over a hundred drawings they had produced during that time.

The inspiration behind naming themselves "Memphis" came about during their first meeting when Bob Dylan's record "Stuck Inside of Mobile with the Memphis Blues Again" had been playing repeatedly in the background. For Sottsass, the name "Memphis" represented two things: a city in Tennessee, and ancient Egypt's capital city. The group of designers then went ahead and used the ambiguity behind the name "Memphis" to represent and symbolise their ambiguous design philosophies of furniture, objects and textiles. In Sottsass' case specifically, he showed great interest in the middle-class taste, the traditions of the Third World and the East, and unspoiled nature.

Sottsass left the group in 1985 to focus on his design and architecture firm, Sottsass Associati.

The group disbanded in 1987 because its members found it difficult to sustain their commercial success after the hype of their new movement had faded.

Impact

Memphis' colorful furniture has been described as "bizarre", "misunderstood", "loathed", and "a shotgun wedding between Bauhaus and Fisher-Price".

During their active years, the group designed a series of non-conformist furniture. One of their most popular and well-known designs is the "Carlton" Room Divider, a totemic pole incorporating a variety of bright colours, solid shapes and voids. The structure itself is constructed using cheap plastic laminates, though designed to be sold by a luxury market, and incorporates a series of equilateral triangles, both real and implied.

The 1980 design of furniture, architecture, household items, and clothes was heavily influenced by Memphis Design.  Surfing, skateboarding, skiing and BMX companies were quick to adopt the aesthetic into their designs.  
Television shows such as Miami Vice showcased many architectural examples. Nickelodeon used the style as the basis for their Double Dare set design.

Memphis designs served as inspiration for the Fall/Winter 2011–2012 Christian Dior haute couture collection fashion show, for the Winter 2015 Missoni collection,

Notable Memphis design collectors included fashion designer Karl Lagerfeld and musician David Bowie. After Bowie's death in 2016, his collection was auctioned off at Sotheby's for a total of £1,387,000.

A "flat, geometric, figurative" illustration style "usually made up of solid colours", popular in the late 2010s, particularly with startups, was dubbed "Corporate Memphis" by Wired Magazine for its resemblance to Memphis designs.

Designers
Being the founder of the group, Ettore Sottsass became the leader of the Memphis Group and is now one of the most well known Italian post-War designers.

Martine Bedin, a French designer, was also a member of Memphis. She first joined the group when she was in her twenties and was deemed in charge of over-looking all Memphis lighting that was produced. Her father had been an engineer and she was also continuously 'playing with forbidden things', all of which contributed to her designated position. During her time in Memphis, Bedin designed and thought of numerous ideas. Her design of the Super lamp placed on wheels, first designed in 1978, supposedly represented, along with a group of other objects, 'friend-like' items. Bedin's lamp was later produced in an artisanal workshop, where all Memphis products were manufactured, and her first prototype is now featured in the Victoria & Albert Museum, in London, England.

Peter Shire, a sculptor, designer and potter originally from California, was another figure who formed the Memphis Group. He was first discovered thanks to Wet: The Magazine of Gourmet Bathing, a lifestyle publication on the west coast that Sottsass' partner on occasion would contribute to. In one article featuring Shire's teapots in 1977, he quoted "I'm not much of a tea-drinker [...] Actually my first impulse is to put Coke in teapots. I'm a big Coke drinker and I'd love to see Coke flowing out of the teapots and foaming on the ground." His unique approach and attitude later secured him a spot as a member of Memphis.

After Memphis' disbandment in 1987, members went their separate ways. Some like Nathalie Du Pasquier, a French-born ex-member of the group, have collaborated with brands and companies in recent years. In 2013, she and the Danish company HAY collaborated where she designed and created Memphis-esque patterned bags. She later on also collaborated with American Apparel, a Canadian-founded fashion company that moved to California, where she designed one of their collections.

The designs of the Memphis Group have acted as an inspiration to many other fashion companies, like Dior and Missoni, who both were inspired to design fashion collections based on Memphis' original work.

Memphis included contributions from many international architects and designers.

Notable members include:
 Ettore Sottsass
 Martine Bedin
 Andrea Branzi
 Aldo Cibic
 Michele De Lucchi
 Nathalie du Pasquier
 Michael Graves
 Massimo Iosa Ghini
 Shiro Kuramata
 Javier Mariscal
 Alessandro Mendini
 Barbara Radice
 Cinzia Ruggeri
 Peter Shire
 George Sowden
 Gerard Taylor
 Matteo Thun
 Masanori Umeda
 Marco Zanini
 Marco Zanuso

Gallery

References

Further reading
Radice, Barbara (1985). Memphis: Research, Experiences, Failures and Successes of New Design. New York: Rizzoli. 
Sparke, Penny (1988). Italian Design: 1870 to the Present. London: Thames & Hudson. 
Horn, Richard (1985). Memphis: Objects, Furniture, and Patterns. New York: Wuarto Marketing.

External links

Memphis Milano Official website
Dennis Zanone's Memphis Collection

Architecture groups
Italian furniture designers
Postmodern architecture
Italian design
Italian designers
Design companies established in 1981
Design companies of Italy
Italian companies disestablished in 1991
Italian companies established in 1981